Plaga Zombie (English: Zombie Plague) is a 1997 Argentine horror film directed by Pablo Parés and Hernán Sáez, the former of whom wrote the film with Berta Muñiz; all three also star in the film. It is the first entry in the Plaga Zombie film series being followed up with Plaga Zombie: Zona Mutante (2001), Plaga Zombie: Zona Mutante – Revolución Tóxica (2012), and Plaga Zombie: American Invasion (2021).

Cast

 Berta Muñiz as  John West
 Pablo Parés as  Bill Johnson
 Hernán Sáez as  Max Giggs
 Walter Cornás as  Mike Taylor
 Paulo Soria as Zombie, FBI, Punk, etc.
 Gabriel Grieco as  Richard Gecko
 Diego Parés as  Willie Boxer
 Martín Lepera as Albert el pizzero
 Esteban Podetti as James Dana
 Pablo Fayó as David Fox

References

External links
 

1997 films
1990s Spanish-language films
1997 horror films
Argentine zombie films
Argentine horror films
1990s Argentine films